Catharina Boehme is the Chef de Cabinet of the World Health Organization. She is known for her work in developing diagnostic tests for diseases such as tuberculosis and for advocating for increased testing for the COVID-19 disease.

Early life and education
Boehme graduated with a Doctor of Medicine degree in 2002 in Internal Medicine from the Ludwig Maximilian University of Munich. She has diplomas in Public Health from Charité and in Management & Leadership from the International Institute for Management Development at Heidelberg University.

Career
Early in her career, Boehme worked at the Department of Infectious and Tropical Diseases in Munich and established a tuberculosis diagnostic research unit in Tanzania.

Boehme became Chief Executive Officer of Foundation for Innovative New Diagnostics (FIND) in 2013. In this capacity, she worked on a collaboration with other partners within the Access to COVID-19 Tools Accelerator to make tests for COVID-19 more broadly available. In 2021 Boehme joined the World Health Organization as Chef de Cabinet to Director-General Tedros Adhanom Ghebreyesus.

Research 
Boehme's early research was on an enzyme within the parasite that causes malaria, and the development of new testing methods for the detection of tuberculosis. Boehme has written in Nature Medicine about the need for diagnostic testing as a means to prevent the spread of diseases such as COVID-19.

Other activities
 World Health Summit (WHS), Member of the Steering Committee

Selected publications

References

External links 
 

Living people
Ludwig Maximilian University of Munich alumni
Women medical researchers
Year of birth missing (living people)

21st-century women physicians
World Health Organization officials
Women nonprofit executives
People in public health
Internists
Tuberculosis researchers
German women physicians
Women internists